The 2018 United States House of Representatives election in Guam was held on Tuesday, November 6, 2018, to elect the non-voting Delegate to the United States House of Representatives from Guam's at-large congressional district. The election coincided with the elections of other federal and state offices, including the larger Guamanian general election, 2018, the 2018 Guam gubernatorial election, and the 2018 United States House of Representatives elections.

The non-voting delegate is elected for a two-year term. Incumbent Democratic Delegate Madeleine Bordallo, who has represented the district since 2003, lost her primary election to Michael San Nicolas, a senator of the Guam Legislature since 2013. San Nicolas was challenged by Republican former public auditor Doris Flores-Brooks for Guam's lone-seat in the United States House of Representatives.

Democratic candidate Michael San Nicolas attained the higher number of votes and took office in January 2019 as Guam's congressional delegate.

Democratic primary

Candidates

Declared
 Madeleine Bordallo, incumbent delegate
 Michael San Nicolas, island senator in the Guam Legislature

Primary results

Republican primary

Candidates

Declared
 Doris Flores-Brooks, public auditor

Declined
 Jonathan Diaz
 Eric Lin

Primary results

General election

Results

References

External links
Campaign finance at FEC 
Campaign finance at OpenSecrets

Official campaign websites
Doris Flores-Brooks (R) for Congress

Guam
2018
United States House of Representatives